Dexthorpe is a deserted medieval village in the East Lindsey district of Lincolnshire, England.

Dexthorpe is listed in the 1086 Domesday Book as part of the Candleshoe Hundred in the South Riding of Lindsey. In 1066 Earl Harold held the Lordship, which in 1086 was granted to Earl Hugh of Chester, who also became Tenant-in-chief. However, by 1577 it had declined and was recorded as having only a pasture, church and parsonage.

In 1829, Edmund Oldfield wrote in his book A topographical and historical account of Wainfleet in the Wapentake  of Candleshoe in the County of Lincoln,  that "the inhabitants of Dexthorpe pay church rates to the incumbent of Well", and that the number of inhabitants in Dalby and Dexthorpe in 1801 were 50, in 1811 there were 71 and by 1821 had risen again to 99. Today the church and village are visible as earthworks.

References 

Deserted medieval villages in Lincolnshire
Archaeological sites in Lincolnshire
East Lindsey District